Seminary Square Park, also known as the Seminary Park, is a historic public park located at Bloomington, Monroe County, Indiana.  It was established in 1816 by an Act of Congress as the original site of Indiana Seminary, a preparatory school that by 1838 became Indiana University.  The first building was erected on the site in 1824, and it remained the school campus until Indiana University moved to its new campus in 1883.  The Old College building, built in 1854, remained in use as a school until destroyed by fire in 1967.  The site was subsequently established as a public park in 1975.

It was listed on the National Register of Historic Places in 1977.

References

Parks on the National Register of Historic Places in Indiana
1816 establishments in Indiana
1975 establishments in Indiana
Buildings and structures in Bloomington, Indiana
National Register of Historic Places in Monroe County, Indiana